Exception, exceptions or expectional may refer to:
Exception (computer science), an anomalous condition during computation
 State of exception, a concept of extension of sovereign power
 Exceptional objects, in mathematics
 Exceptional isomorphisms

As a proper name
 "Exception" (song), by Ana Johnsson
 Exception (video game), a 2019 game from Traxmaster Software
 Exception (TV series), a 2022 anime series on Netflix
 The Exception, a 2016 British film
 Exceptional: Why the World Needs a Powerful America, a 2015 book by Dick and Liz Cheney
 The Exceptions, a German demo (computer art) group

See also
 Exceptionality (disambiguation)
 Exemption (disambiguation)
 Accept (disambiguation)